Jerry Hill (born July 25, 1961) is an American former stock car racing driver and father of current NASCAR Xfinity Series/NASCAR Craftsman Truck Series driver Timmy Hill and current NASCAR Craftsman Truck Series driver Tyler Hill. He was born in Brandywine, Maryland. He was a fixture on the Craftsman Truck Series for years, but has competed on all levels of NASCAR.

Winston Cup Series

Hill made his debut in 1991, running the #56 Hill Motorsports Pontiac that he would drive throughout his Cup career. In his debut at Dover, Hill started and finished 38th after vibration problems, only completing 39 laps. In his second start at Rockingham, Hill managed to improve on qualifying, but finished 38th just the same after being flagged.

Hill would run four races for the team in 1992. He managed his best finish of the year of 27th at Rockingham, the only race he finished. He also improved on qualifying in 1992, earning a career best of 36th at Dover.

Hill ran two races in 1993, his last Cup starts. They both came at Rockingham, they were both 38th-place finishes and they were both DNFs. So, with the dismal results, Hill left the Cup Series.

Busch Series

Hill competed in two Busch Series races. They came in 2004, running for MacDonald Motorsports. Hill started 40th at Gateway in his debut, but managed to finish the race in 26th. Then, at Daytona, Hill started 24th and finished 22nd, thus completing a respectable run in that series.

Craftsman Truck Series

Hill spent the majority of his career in this series, making 58 starts. However, he never finished on the lead lap. He made his debut in 2001 at Darlington, starting 36th and finishing 26th. Hill finished 27th at Dover and then 17th at Kentucky, before switching over to MacDonald Motorsports CTS program for two races, the better being a 24th at IRP. Hill then finished out the season at Troxell Racing. He earned two top-20 finishes for that team: a 17th at Texas and an 18th at Chicago Motor. Despite all the swapping, Hill managed 25th in points.

Hill made all but one race in the 2002 season. He drove the #79 RDS Motorsports Dodge throughout the entire season. The low-budget team struggled, but hung around. Their best finish were a triple of 18ths at Texas, Dover and Darlington. However, Hill ran consistently, recording nine top-20 finishes and finishing all but three races. The decent season allowed Hill to finish 23rd in points.

Hill moved to Ware Racing Enterprises for 2003, competing the majority of the schedule en route to an 18th-place finish in points. Oddly, despite the career best points finish, Hill only finished in the top-20 five times, and only once above twentieth. His best finish was 18th at Kansas. Hill's main issue was the inability to finish races. Unlike in 2002, Hill only finished twelve of his twenty-two starts, and that inconsistency weighed his team down.

Hill ran two races in 2004, both for MacDonald Motorsports while he was doing their Busch runs. He was 26th at Atlanta and 32nd at Dover. The lackluster runs did not earn Hill another ride in the series, and he has not raced in major NASCAR since. His son Timmy currently drives for Rick Ware in the Nationwide Series.

Motorsports career results

NASCAR
(key) (Bold – Pole position awarded by qualifying time. Italics – Pole position earned by points standings or practice time. * – Most laps led.)

Winston Cup Series

Daytona 500

Busch Series

Craftsman Truck Series

External links
 

ARCA Menards Series drivers
Living people
NASCAR drivers
1961 births
People from Brandywine, Maryland
Racing drivers from Maryland